The Electronic Cultural Atlas Initiative (ECAI) is a digital humanities initiative involving numerous academic professors and institutions around the world with the stated goal of creating a networked digital atlas by creating tools and setting standards for dynamic, digital maps.

ECAI was established in 1997 by Emeritus Prof. Lewis Lancaster of the University of California, Berkeley, and has held two meetings per year most years from 1998 - 2009 (ongoing), one of which is often in conjunction with the Pacific Neighbourhood Consortium. The initiative is based at UC Berkeley.

The ECAI 'clearinghouse' of distributed digital datasets was developed from 1998 by the Archaeological Computing Laboratory at the University of Sydney, and uses the ACL's TimeMap software.

See also
GIS
Wikimaps

External links
http://www.ecai.org/
 Historical Geographic Information Systems Online Forum on Google

Cartography organizations
Geographic information systems organizations
Digital humanities
Historical geographic information systems
University of California, Berkeley
Research institutes in the San Francisco Bay Area
Digital humanities projects
1997 establishments in California